The 1928 Nova Scotia general election was held on 1 October 1928 to elect members of the 39th House of Assembly of the Province of Nova Scotia, Canada. It was won by the Liberal-Conservative party.

Results

Results by party

Retiring incumbents
Liberal-Conservative 
William Boardman Armstrong, Colchester
William Hudson Farnham, Digby
Alexander Montgomerie, Halifax
Alexander O'Handley, Cape Breton East
William Drysdale Piercey, Halifax

Nominated candidates
Legend
bold denotes party leader
† denotes an incumbent who is not running for re-election or was defeated in nomination contest
0

Valley

|-
|rowspan=2 bgcolor=whitesmoke|Annapolis
||
|Obediah Parker Goucher3,68925.90%
| 
|John D. McKenzie3,45024.22%
|
|
||
|Obediah Parker Goucher
|-
||
|Harry Thompson MacKenzie3,64525.59%
|
|Daniel Owen3,46124.30%
|
|
||
|Harry Thompson MacKenzie
|-
|rowspan=2 bgcolor=whitesmoke|Digby
|
|Jean-Louis Philippe Robicheau3,12522.88%
||
|Joseph William Comeau3,76327.55%
|
|
||
|Jean-Louis Philippe Robicheau
|-
|
|H.E. Wagner3,21323.52%
||
|Alexander Stirling MacMillan3,55726.04%
|
|
||
|William Hudson Farnham†
|-
|rowspan=2 bgcolor=whitesmoke|Hants
||
|Albert Parsons4,08726.46%
|
|James William Reid3,82324.75%
|
|
||
|Albert Parsons
|-
||
|Edgar Nelson Rhodes4,00825.95%
|
|Robert Gass3,52822.84%
|
|
||
|Edgar Nelson Rhodes
|-
|rowspan=2 bgcolor=whitesmoke|Kings
||
|George Nowlan5,45227.25%
|
|James F. Durno5,00325.01%
|
|
||
|George Nowlan
|-
||
|Reginald Tucker Caldwell5,54027.69%
|
|Frederick J. Porter4,01020.04%
|
|
||
|Reginald Tucker Caldwell
|}

South Shore

|-
|rowspan=2 bgcolor=whitesmoke|Lunenburg
|
|Wallace Norman Rehfuss5,70923.71%
||
|John James Kinley6,53327.13%
|
|
||
|Wallace Norman Rehfuss
|-
|
|William Haslam Smith5,53522.98%
||
|Gordon E. Romkey6,30426.18%
|
|
||
|William Haslam Smith
|-
|rowspan=2 bgcolor=whitesmoke|Queens
||
|William Lorimer Hall2,20629.36%
|
|Frederick Dickie1,64921.95%
|
|
||
|William Lorimer Hall
|-
||
|Donald W. MacKay1,93725.78%
|
|Roland M. Irving1,72122.91%
|
|
||
|Vacant
|-
|rowspan=2 bgcolor=whitesmoke|Shelburne
|
|Ernest Reginald Nickerson2,12123.26%
||
|Henry R. L. Bill2,47427.13%
|
|
||
|Ernest Reginald Nickerson
|-
|
|Norman Emmons Smith2,05222.50%
||
|Wishart McLea Robertson2,47327.12%
|
|
||
|Norman Emmons Smith
|-
|rowspan=2 bgcolor=whitesmoke|Yarmouth 
|
|John Flint Cahan3,66624.26%
||
|Lindsay C. Gardner4,14127.41%
|
|
||
|John Flint Cahan
|-
|
|Raymond Neri d'Entremont3,28621.75%
||
|René W.E. Landry4,01626.58%
|
|
||
|Raymond Neri d'Entremont
|}

Fundy-Northeast

|-
|rowspan=2 bgcolor=whitesmoke|Colchester
||
|William A. Flemming4,88227.74%
|
|William R. Dunbar3,58320.36%
|
|
||
|William Boardman Armstrong†
|-
||
|Frank Stanfield5,29830.10%
|
|Donald L. MacKinnon3,83921.81%
|
|
||
|Frank Stanfield
|-
|rowspan=3 bgcolor=whitesmoke|Cumberland
|
|
|
|John S. Smiley6,23015.99%
||
|Archibald Terris6,66717.11%
||
|Archibald Terris
|-
||
|Percy Chapman Black7,71019.78%
|
|Charles H. Read5,75814.78%
|
|
||
|Percy Chapman Black
|-
||
|Daniel George McKenzie6,60516.95%
|
|Kenneth Judson Cochrane5,99915.39%
|
|
||
|Daniel George McKenzie
|}

Halifax

|-
|rowspan=5 bgcolor=whitesmoke|Halifax
|
|John Archibald Walker11,0769.95%
||
|Edward Joseph Cragg11,21510.08%
|
|
||
|John Archibald Walker
|-
|
|Frederick P. Bligh11,0829.96%
||
|Gordon Benjamin Isnor11,35710.21%
|
|
||
|William Drysdale Piercey†
|-
||
|Josiah Frederick Fraser11,29810.15%
|
|Thomas J. Byrne10,9399.83%
|
|
||
|Josiah Frederick Fraser
|-
||
|John Francis Mahoney11,58910.41%
|
|Bernard W. Russell10,8559.76%
|
|
||
|John Francis Mahoney
|-
||
|Angus MacDonald Morton11,27310.13%
|
|William J. Kennedy10,5919.52%
|
|
||
|Alexander Montgomerie†
|}

Central Nova

|-
|rowspan=2 bgcolor=whitesmoke|Antigonish 
|
|John D. MacIntyre1,79220.95%
||
|John L. MacIsaac2,43128.42%
|
|
||
|John L. MacIsaac
|-
|
|John F. McLellan1,92522.50%
||
|William Chisholm2,40728.14%
|
|
||
|William Chisholm
|-
|rowspan=2 bgcolor=whitesmoke|Guysborough
|
|Simon Osborn Giffin2,98023.60%
||
|Clarence W. Anderson3,33726.43%
|
|
||
|Simon Osborn Giffin
|-
|
|Howard Amos Rice3,01823.90%
||
|Michael E. Morrison3,29326.08%
|
|
||
|Howard Amos Rice
|-
|rowspan=3 bgcolor=whitesmoke|Pictou
||
|John Doull7,83618.21%
|
|Donald F. Fraser7,05216.38%
|
|
||
|John Doull
|-
||
|Hugh Allan MacQuarrie7,24916.84%
|
|A.T. Logan6,83615.88%
|
|
||
|Hugh Allan MacQuarrie
|-
||
|Robert Albert Douglas7,57217.59%
|
|Clifford E. Carruthers6,49815.10%
|
|
||
|Robert Albert Douglas
|}

Cape Breton

|-
|rowspan=2 bgcolor=whitesmoke|Cape Breton Centre
||
|Gordon Sidney Harrington5,94929.22%
|
|Malcolm A. Patterson4,38421.54%
|
|
||
|Gordon Sidney Harrington
|-
||
|Joseph Macdonald5,76228.31%
|
|Luke Daye4,26120.93%
|
|
||
|Joseph Macdonald
|-
|rowspan=2 bgcolor=whitesmoke|Cape Breton East
||
|Daniel R. Cameron5,54121.98%
|
|Lauchlin Daniel Currie4,72418.73%
|
|Forman Waye2,2739.01%
||
|Vacant
|-
||
|Robert Hamilton Butts5,56822.08%
|
|Dan C. McDonald4,52017.93%
|
|James B. McLachlan2,58910.27%
||
|Alexander O'Handley†
|-
|rowspan=2 bgcolor=whitesmoke|Inverness
|
|Hubert Meen Aucoin3,86523.37%
||
|Moses Elijah McGarry4,31826.11%
|
|
||
|Hubert Meen Aucoin
|-
|
|Malcolm McKay3,93023.77%
||
|James A. Proudfoot4,42226.74%
|
|
||
|Malcolm McKay
|-
|rowspan=2 bgcolor=whitesmoke|Richmond-West Cape Breton
|
|Benjamin Amedeé LeBlanc2,04424.77%
||
|Alonzo Martell2,05524.90%
|
|
||
|Benjamin Amedeé LeBlanc
|-
|
|John Angus Stewart2,03524.66%
||
|Edward C. Doyle2,11825.67%
|
|
||
|John Angus Stewart
|-
|rowspan=2 bgcolor=whitesmoke|Victoria
|
|H.A. Grant1,64023.75%
||
|Donald Buchanan McLeod1,84026.65%
|
|
||
|Donald Buchanan McLeod
|-
|
|Phillip McLeod1,65223.92%
||
|Daniel Alexander Cameron1,77325.68%
|
|
||
|Phillip McLeod
|}

References

Further reading
 

1928
1928 elections in Canada
1928 in Nova Scotia
October 1928 events